The Indore–Ujjain Passenger is a passenger train of the Indian Railways, which runs between Indore Junction railway station of Indore, the largest city and commercial capital of Madhya Pradesh and Ujjain Junction railway station of Ujjain, the 5th largest city and  cultural capital of Madhya Pradesh

Schedule
The following is the current running schedule of the train. It takes roughly 2-2.5 hours to travel to and fro between Indore & Ujjain depending on the route taken.

Ujjain to Indore

Indore to Ujjain

Route and halts

Via Dewas 
The train 09506/09507 travels on the Indore-Dewas-Ujjain section via Dewas Jn. The important halts of the train are :
 Ujjain Jn
 Karchha
 Dewas Jn
 Manglia
 Laxmibai Nagar
 Indore Jn

Via Fatehabad Chandrawatiganj
The trains 09351/09352 and 09353/09354 travel on the Fatehabad Chandrawatiganj-Ujjain section via Fatehabad Chandrawatiganj Jn.The important halts of the train are :
 Ujjain Jn
 Chintaman Ganesh
 Fatehabad Chandrawatiganj Jn
 Ajnod
 Laxmibai Nagar
 Indore Jn

Coach composite
The train consists of 18 coaches:
 1 First Class
 4 Sleeper coaches
 10 Unreserved
 1 Ladies/Handicapped
 2 Luggage/Brake van

Average speed and frequency
The train runs with an average speed of 35 km/h. The train runs on a daily basis.

Loco link
The train is hauled by Ratlam RTM WDM-3 Diesel engine.

Rake maintenance and sharing
The train is maintained by the Indore Coaching Depot. The same rake is used for five trains, which are Indore–Chhindwara Panchvalley Express, Indore–Maksi Fast Passenger, Bhopal–Ujjain Passenger, Bhopal–Indore Passenger and Bhopal–Bina Passenger for one way which is altered by the second rake on the other way.

See also
Avantika Express
Indore Junction
Bhopal Junction

References

Transport in Indore
Railway services introduced in 1996
Rail transport in Madhya Pradesh
Slow and fast passenger trains in India
Transport in Ujjain